Michigan's 95th State House District is a Michigan legislative district currently located in part of Gladwin County and all of Midland County.

Previously, under the 2000 US Census, the 95th district was part of Saginaw County, and included the city of Saginaw, Buena Vista Township, Spaulding Township, and Bridgeport Township.

As a result of decennial legislative redistricting, proceeding the findings of the 2010 US Census, the district boundaries will expand to include Carrollton Township, James Township, Kochville Township, and the city of Zilwaukee and Zilwaukee Township. The district will also retain its previous municipalities.

The 95th state house district is currently represented by State Representative Amos O'Neal.

Vanessa Guerra of Saginaw was restricted by term limits by the 2020 Michigan House of Representatives election.

List of officer holders

Election results

2020

Historical district boundaries

References

Michigan House of Representatives districts